Daniel Reilly may refer to:

 Daniel P. Reilly (born 1989), American politician in Rhode Island
 Daniel Patrick Reilly (born 1928), American prelate of the Roman Catholic Church